The faixa is a traditional Catalan clothing accessory. It is a waist sash made of a long piece of cloth, similar to a sash. It is worn around the waist and wraps around several times. During the 19th century, the farmers and artisans wore it to warm up the kidneys and to protect the lumbar area during the work in the fields. The bourgeois used to wear it as a sign of power, with different colours and 3 meters long. Nowadays, it is present in many traditional dances and festivals. This garment was common in Catalan and Occitan.

Catalonian traditional uses 

In Catalonia they use the "faixa" for their traditional dances and spectacles:
 Castellers: It is an essential part for the Casteller activity. It is almost always black, with different lengths and widths, depending on the age, height and weight of the person who wears it. It is worn at the height of the kidneys and it has 2 functions: to protect the lumbar region of the back against on the weight and movements of the structure, and to be use as a support point for other climbers to use to climb up and down.
 Sardana: an optional clothing item for male sardanistes
 Falcons: (Catalan version of the Czech sokol gymnastic demonstration sport) The faixa is used to differentiate the teams by coloring. It also serves to protect the lumbar region and to assist with the various figures.

Gallery

References

Sashes
Shawls and wraps
Catalan culture
Spanish clothing